Dorset East and Hampshire West was a European Parliament constituency covering most of Dorset and parts of western Hampshire in England.

Prior to its uniform adoption of proportional representation for European elections in 1999, the United Kingdom used first-past-the-post for the elections in England, Scotland and Wales. The European Parliament constituencies used under that system were smaller than the later regional constituencies and only had one Member of the European Parliament each.

The constituency consisted of the Westminster Parliament constituencies of Bournemouth East, Bournemouth West, Christchurch, New Forest, North Dorset, Poole, Romsey and Waterside and South Dorset.

The constituency replaced most of Wessex and parts of Hampshire West.  It was itself replaced by much of Dorset and East Devon and parts of Itchen, Test and Avon in 1994.  These seats became part of the much larger South West England and South East England constituencies in 1999.

Members of the European Parliament

Results

|- style="background-color:#F6F6F6"
! style="background-color: " |
| colspan="2"   | New creation:  gain.
| align="right" | Swing
| align="right" | N/A
||

References

External links
 David Boothroyd's United Kingdom Election Results 

European Parliament constituencies in England (1979–1999)
Politics of Dorset
Politics of Hampshire
1984 establishments in England
1994 disestablishments in England
Constituencies established in 1984
Constituencies disestablished in 1994